Tugman is a surname. Notable people with the surname include:

Blair Tugman, American mixed martial artist 
Jimmy Tugman (born 1945), British footballer
William M. Tugman (1894–1961), American journalist

See also
Šugman